The PowerBook 150 is a laptop personal computer created by Apple Computer which was introduced on July 13, 1994, and released on July 18, 1994. It was the last member of the PowerBook 100 series to use the original case design, the most affordable of the series when introduced (priced between $1,450 and $1,600) and also the last consumer model.

It was 8 MHz faster than its predecessor, the PowerBook 145B. It lacked an ADB port and used a lower-quality passive matrix display than other contemporary offerings, both to reduce the price. It also lacked external monitor support. Like the Duos and the PowerBook 100 before it, the 150 only had a single serial printer port, however, a third-party adapter was available for use in the optional modem slot. One interesting improvement was the display's resolution of 640x480 - an increase from the earlier PowerBook resolution of 640x400, and more in line with standard desktop monitors of the time.

Though it used the 140 case design, its internals were based on the PowerBook Duo 230 and actually more similar to the features of the PowerBook 190 (which used the PowerBook 5300's case design). Notably, this new logicboard design allowed this 100 series PowerBook to use more than 14 MB RAM for the first time. It was also the first of the 100 series to include a lithium-ion backup battery to preserve RAM contents when the battery is replaced, as well as the first Macintosh ever to use less expensive and larger IDE drives (formatting required a unique software application limiting the selection of compatible drives). This was the last PowerBook model to include a trackball. Like the 145B it replaced, the 150 could not be used in SCSI Disk Mode, unlike the Duo, 190 and 5300 which had HD Target Mode implemented.

Specifications 

Processor: Motorola 68030, running at 33 MHz
RAM: 4 MB on board, expandable to 36 MB
ROM: 1 MB
Hard disk: 120–240 MB
Floppy disk: 1.4 MB
Systems supported: System 7.1.1 – Mac OS 7.6.1
ADB: No
Serial: Yes (1 port)
Modem: Optional (used for this model's expansion port)
Screen: passive matrix, 4-bit greyscale (16 shades) at a resolution of 640×480

Timeline

References

External links 
 apple-history.com: PowerBook 150

150
68k Macintosh computers